Radu Podgorean (born 22 March 1955 in Bucharest) is a Romanian politician. From 2000 to 2008, he represented Sibiu County in the Chamber of Deputies. During 2007, he served as a Member of the European Parliament.  He is a member of the Social Democratic Party, part of the Party of European Socialists, and became an MEP on 1 January 2007 with the accession of Romania to the European Union.  He was on the Committee of Agriculture and Rural Development, Committee for Petitions, and Delegation for Relations with Iran.

External links 
 European Parliament profile
 European Parliament official photo

1955 births
Living people
Social Democratic Party (Romania) politicians
Politicians from Bucharest
Social Democratic Party (Romania) MEPs
MEPs for Romania 2007
Members of the Chamber of Deputies (Romania)